Aparecida Esporte Clube is a football club in the city of Aparecida de Goiânia, in the state of Goiás that competes in the second division of Campeonato Goiano.

History
Founded on January 1, 1995 in the city of Aparecida de Goiânia in the state of Goiás, the club is affiliated to Federação Goiana de Futebol and has played in Campeonato Goiano (First Division) one time, Campeonato Goiano (Second Division) six times and Campeonato Goiano (Third Division) ten times.

Titles
Campeonato Goiano Second Division: 1999
Campeonato Goiano Third Division: 2016

References 

Association football clubs established in 1995
Football clubs in Goiás